Stardom Road is the thirteenth solo studio album by the British singer/songwriter Marc Almond. It was released by Sanctuary Records on 4 June 2007.

Background
Stardom Road was Almond's first new album after his involvement in a near-fatal traffic accident in October 2004. It is an album composed mostly of cover versions, a fact borne out of necessity as Almond found himself unable to write following the accident. Almond told Time Out that the album is intended as "a trip down memory lane, a musical journey from the 1950s to where he finds himself today".

The album features collaborations with Sarah Cracknell, Antony Hegarty and Jools Holland, with some of the tracks also featuring members of Jools Holland's Rhythm and Blues Orchestra.

Critical reception

The album was well received by critics overall. Thom Jurek in his AllMusic review calls Stardom Road Almond's "finest studio moment as a solo artist" and describes Almond's voice as having "never been less histrionic, yet more expressive". Record Collector critic Joel McIver calls Stardom Road "the campest album ever released" and summarises that it is "entertaining rather than cutting edge". The Manchester Evening News review notes the autobiographical concept and calls the album "a great comeback" that is "kitsch, camp, melodramatic, yet full of heartfelt emotion".

Track listing

Personnel
Marc Almond – vocals
Trevor Barry – bass
Chris Dagley – drums
Robbie McIntosh – guitar, ukulele
Mike Smith – piano, harpsichord, recorder
Richard Henry – bass trombone
Winston Rollins – trombone
Dominic Glover – trumpet
Chris Storr – trumpet
David Powell – tuba
John Anderson – oboe
Marius de Vries – keyboards, programming
Lenny Plaxico – bass
Rob Burger – keyboards
Hugh Webb – harp
Andy Caine – backing vocals
Andy Ross – backing vocals
Anna Ross – backing vocals
Jools Holland – piano
Dave Swift – bass
Gilson Lavis – drums
Chris Holland – organ
Neal Whitmore – guitar
Igor Outkine – accordion
Isobel Griffiths – string contractor
Gavyn Wright – string leader

Chart performance

References

2007 albums
Marc Almond albums
Albums produced by Marius de Vries
Sanctuary Records albums